Laawaris may refer to:
 Laawaris (1981 film), an Indian drama film directed by Prakash Mehra
 Laawaris (1999 film), an Indian romance film directed by Shrikant Sharma